Events from the year 1973 in Scotland...

Incumbents 

 Secretary of State for Scotland and Keeper of the Great Seal – Gordon Campbell

Law officers 
 Lord Advocate – Norman Wylie
 Solicitor General for Scotland – William Stewart

Judiciary 
 Lord President of the Court of Session and Lord Justice General – Lord Emslie
 Lord Justice Clerk – Lord Wheatley
 Chairman of the Scottish Land Court – Lord Birsay

Events 
 1 January – most of the west coast shipping services of David MacBrayne are merged with those of the Caledonian Steam Packet Company as Caledonian MacBrayne.
 1 March – Dundee East by-election: Labour retains the seat by only 1,141 votes in the face of a strong SNP challenge.
 May – The Co-operative Group: The Scottish Co-operative (Wholesale) Society Ltd merges into the UK-wide Co-operative Wholesale Society Ltd following serious financial mismanagement of the SCWS Bank.
 17 July – Stonehouse, South Lanarkshire, is formally designated as a New Town but never developed.
 25 October – Local Government (Scotland) Act initiates a major reorganisation of local government in Scotland with effect from May 1975).
 26 October – firefighters in Glasgow stage a one-day strike following a pay dispute. Troops are drafted in to run the fire stations.
 31 October – the Kilbrandon Report is published and recommends the establishment of a directly elected Scottish Assembly.
 8 November – Glasgow Govan by-election results in Margo MacDonald of the Scottish National Party (SNP) gaining the seat from Labour on a 26.7% swing. In a second Scottish by election that day, the Conservatives retain Edinburgh North.
 14 December – third (replacement) Bonar Bridge opened.
 21 December – armed robbery of British Rail Engineering Limited in Glasgow, in which James Kennedy, a security guard, is killed, earning a posthumous George Cross for his gallantry.
 31 December – Radio Clyde begins broadcasting, from Clydebank.
 The Church of Scotland introduces the Church Hymnary, third edition, an entirely new compilation.

Births 
 20 January – Stephen Crabb, Welsh Conservative politician
 18 March – Patrick Harvie, Green politician
 10 May – Dario Franchitti, racing driver
 14 May – Fraser Nelson, political journalist
 26 May – Julie Wilson Nimmo, actress
 15 September – Alyn Smith, SNP MEP, MP
 24 September – Gillian Lindsay, rower
 5 October – Kay Moran, lawn bowler
 13 October – Peter Dumbreck, racing driver
 Iain Finlay Macleod, playwright and novelist

Deaths 
 15 January – Neil M. Gunn, novelist, critic and dramatist (born 1891)
 22 February – F. Marian McNeill, folklorist (born 1885)
 23 September – A. S. Neill, progressive educator and author (born 1883) 
 8 October – John Rankin, Labour politician (born 1890)
 5 December – Robert Watson-Watt, pioneer of radar (born 1892)
 21 December – James Kennedy, security guard murdered in raid (born 1930)
 30 December
 D. E. Stevenson (Dorothy Peploe), romantic novelist (born 1892)
 Vagaland (Thomas Alexander Robertson), Shetland dialect poet (born 1909)
 Sir William Gillies, painter (born 1898)

The arts
 31 March – John McGrath's play The Cheviot, the Stag, and the Black Black Oil is premiered by 7:84 in Aberdeen.
 11 May–8 June – The political thriller Scotch on the Rocks, concerning a terrorist group fighting for Scottish independence in the near future, is broadcast by BBC Scotland.
 Canongate Books is established as a publisher in Edinburgh.
 George Mackay Brown's novel Magnus is published.
 Celtic rock group Runrig formed on Skye.

See also 
 1973 in Northern Ireland

References 

 
Scotland
Years of the 20th century in Scotland
1970s in Scotland